Mike Larrison (born November 7, 1981) is an American racing driver from Coatesville, Indiana.

Larrison competed in the Xtreme Sprint Car Series in 2010 and 2011, finishing 10th and 11th in points respectively. He also made two USAC Midget starts and four USAC Silver Crown starts over that time period. He signed with Andretti Autosport to make his Firestone Indy Lights debut in October 2011 at the Las Vegas Motor Speedway but was injured in a testing crash at Kentucky Speedway prior to the race and was not cleared to participate. He made his Indy Lights debut the following season with Belardi Auto Racing in the Freedom 100. Larrison drove in three more oval races later in the season for the team with a best finish of ninth (twice) and finished 14th in points.

References

External links

1981 births
Racing drivers from Indiana
Indy Lights drivers
People from Hendricks County, Indiana
Living people
USAC Silver Crown Series drivers

Belardi Auto Racing drivers
Andretti Autosport drivers